Jean de Grailly may refer to:

Jean I de Grailly (died c. 1301), seneschal of Gascony, crusader
Jean II de Grailly (died. 1343), great-grandson of prec., Captal de Buch
Jean III de Grailly (died 1376), son of prec., Captal de Buch, founding knight of the Garter
John I, Count of Foix (died 1436), also called Jean de Foix-Grailly
John de Foix, 1st Earl of Kendal (died 1485), also called Jean de Foix-Grailly